James Ravenscroft (died 1680) was a lawyer, merchant, and philanthropist in Chipping Barnet, in what is now north London.

Early life and family
He was the son of Thomas Ravenscroft.

Career

Ravenscroft was a lawyer and merchant, dealing in  lace, currants and glass.

In 1679, Ravenscroft, then of High Holborn in London, had the Ravenscroft Almshouses built for six "poore antient women".

Death and legacy

Ravenscroft died on 28 January 1680. Barnet Recreation Ground was renamed Ravenscroft Gardens in his memory.

References

External links 

1680 deaths
Year of birth missing
English philanthropists
English lawyers